Hechtia caerulea is a plant species in the genus Hechtia. This species is endemic to Mexico.

References

caerulea
Flora of Mexico